Anthony Deane (born 3 July 1984) is an Australian skeleton athlete who has competed since 2009. He has two victories in North American Cup events, both earned at Calgary in December 2009.

Deane qualified for the 2010 Winter Olympics, finishing 23rd after only 18 months in the sports.

External links
 
 
 
 

1984 births
Australian male skeleton racers
Living people
Olympic skeleton racers of Australia
Skeleton racers at the 2010 Winter Olympics